USS Key West was a steamer acquired by the Union Navy during the American Civil War. She was used by the Union Navy as a convoy and patrol vessel on Confederate waterways, only to be sunk, along with Elfin and Tawah by Confederate shore batteries.

Service history
Key West was built in 1862 at California, Pennsylvania, as Key West No. 8; purchased by the Navy from W. S. Evans et al. at Cairo, Illinois, 16 April 1863; and commissioned 26 May, Acting Master E. M. King in command. The wooden stern-wheel steamer departed Cairo that day for patrol duty in the Tennessee River, supporting Union Army efforts and protecting Federal positions in the Tennessee Valley from Confederate Cavalry raids. Frequently, as she patrolled the river and escorted transports and supply ships, her guns engaged hit-and-run batteries and bands of riflemen.

On 10 October 1864, as troops debarked at Eastport, Mississippi, from three transports Key West and Undine had escorted from Clifton, Tennessee, a hidden Confederate 6-gun battery at Eastport and a 3-gun battery near Chickasaw opened fire on the Union ships. After the Southern guns had set two of the transports on fire and damaged Key West with two rifle shots, the Union ships reluctantly retired downstream out-of-range. On 2 November at Johnsonville, Tennessee, Key West assisted Tawah in recapturing transport Venus, taken along with Undine and Cheeseman by the Confederates there 30 October. After a vigorous action in which Key West was hit 19 times by rifled artillery, the three Union gunboats, riddled and almost out of ammunition, were set afire and scuttled.

References 

Ships of the Union Navy
Ships built in California, Pennsylvania
Gunboats of the United States Navy
Steamships of the United States Navy
American Civil War patrol vessels of the United States
1862 ships
Shipwrecks of the American Civil War
Shipwrecks in rivers
Maritime incidents in November 1864